Business Planning and Control System (BPCS) is an Enterprise Resource Planning (ERP) software product.

BPCS, the acronym for the software, is pronounced as "Bee picks" or "Bee pecks" in Spanish-speaking countries.

Overview 
BPCS was developed by Chicago-based System Software Associates (SSA), which later became SSA Global Technologies (which was then acquired by Infor Global Solutions and rebranded as Infor LX), and is used to control the operations of manufacturing companies. BPCS includes MRP logic to manufacturing operations, provided there are high standards of data validity such as engineering specifications and inventory accuracy. It runs on several systems, with IBM I, being most popular.  It is written in AS/SET CASE tool, RPG, SQL and other languages supported on IBM I.

Many of the BPCS modules are stand-alone, in that companies can choose to implement only the financial applications for example, and none of the manufacturing.  

SSA began developing BPCS in the early 1980s; by the mid 1990s the BPCS programs were used internationally. Inc. magazine ranked SSA as the 23rd fastest growing small public company in 1988  and Business Week named it as the 25th best small company.

BPCS Applications 
BPCS Applications are very dependent on BPCS software version release, because SSA enters into partnerships with different specialty suppliers of applications such as Data Mining, Bar Coding, etc. and suppliers that integrated with a particular version.

The BPCS Application suite includes:

Financial 
 Costing CST
 Accounts Payable ACP
 Accounts Receivable ACR
 Billing BIL
 General Ledger GLD
 Cash Management CSH
 Multiple Currencies  MLT
 Currency Translation CTR
 Financial Assistant FIN
 Fixed Assets FXA
 Payroll PAY
 Business Modeling
 Data Mining

Planning 
Most planning functions can be used in either Distribution or Manufacturing.
 Forecasting FOR
 Master Scheduling MPS
 Material Requirements Planning MRP
 Capacity Planning CAP
 Distribution Resource Planning (inter facility) DRP
 Planner's Assistant PLN
 Simulations
 Just In Time JIT

Distribution 
Most planning functions are used in both Distribution and Manufacturing.
 Inventory INV
 Purchasing PUR
 Customer Order Processing ORD
 Billing BIL
 Sales Analysis SAL
 Promotions and Deals PRO
 Performance Measurement  PRF
 such as supplier quality and on-time, company performance in supplying customers, internal quality control
 Multiple Environments, Companies, Divisions, Facilities, Warehouses, Locations.

Manufacturing 
Most planning functions are used in both Distribution and Manufacturing.
 Manufacturing Data Management BOM
 Also Routings as SFC sub-set
 Inventory INV
 Shop Floor Control SFC
 Master Scheduling MPS
 Material Requirements Planning MRP
 Capacity planning CAP
 Laboratory Management LMS
 Just In Time JIT
 Quality Control QMS
 Repetitive Manufacturing
 CIMPath (barcoding and data collection) CIM
 Advanced Process (chemical) Industries API
 Performance Measurement (factory production) PRF

Systems Applications 
 ASAP Information Retrieval
 Misc Reports & Retrievals
 System Parameters or Business Rules
 Transaction Effects
 Documentation
 Data Base X-Reference
 Interest Area Menus
 Sliding Y2K Window
 Data Base upgrade

See also 
 Business System Planning

References

Business planning
ERP software